Haifa al-Bakr is a Qatari lawyer, the first woman to be licensed as a lawyer in Qatar.

In 2000 she became the first woman licensed to practise law in Qatar, paving the way for other women to follow her into the profession.

References

Year of birth missing (living people)
Living people
Qatari lawyers
21st-century women lawyers